Steinar Gil (born 27 January 1943) is a Norwegian philologist and diplomat.

He was born in Oslo, and worked at the University of Oslo from 1972 to 1980. He started working for the Norwegian Ministry of Foreign Affairs in 1984, being promoted to assistant secretary in 1993. He served at the embassy of Norway in Moscow from 1996 to 1999, before returning to the Ministry of Foreign Affairs as head of the Eastern Europe department. He then served at the Norwegian ambassador to Azerbaijan from 2002 to 2006, and to Lithuania from 2006 to 2011.

References

1943 births
Living people
Norwegian civil servants
Ambassadors of Norway to Azerbaijan
Ambassadors of Norway to Lithuania
Norwegian philologists
Academic staff of the University of Oslo